Gladys Mills Phipps (June 19, 1883 - October 19, 1970) was a United States socialite, sportsperson, and a thoroughbred racehorse owner and breeder who began the Phipps family dynasty in American horse racing. She was known as the "first lady of the turf".

Early life
She was born in New York on June 19, 1883 to Ruth Livingston (1855–1920) and Ogden Mills (1856–1929).  She had a twin sister, Beatrice, Countess Granard (1883–1972), and a brother, Ogden Livingston Mills (1884–1937) who served as the United States Secretary of the Treasury.

Career
This sportswoman was an avid ice skater and an excellent golfer; she won a number of tournaments,  including a match play championship at the Newport, Rhode Island golf course in which she beat her male counterparts. She was, however, first and foremost a lover of horses. Her father had owned  racing stables in the United States and in France. Her twin, Beatrice, would inherit the French stable and become a leading owner in that country.  Gladys Phipps became involved in the sport of Thoroughbred racing in 1926, when she and her brother Ogden L. Mills established the highly successful Wheatley Stable.  Both of her children became involved in Thoroughbred horse racing.

Personal life
In 1907, Gladys Mills married Henry Carnegie Phipps (1879–1953), son of the wealthy Pittsburgh, Pennsylvania businessman, Henry Phipps. Together they had:

 Ogden Phipps (1908–2002), who was married to Ruth Pruyn (1907–1994), and later, Lillian Stokes Bostwick (1906–1987)
 Barbara Phipps (1911–1987), who married Stuart Symington Janney Jr. (1907–1988). They were the parents of Stuart S. Janney III
 Audrey Phipps (d. 1992), who was married to Philip Dana Holden (d. 1973), an investment banker
 Sonia Phipps (1919–2006), who was married to Hans Christoph Farrell, Count of Seherr-Thoss (1912–1992).

Gladys Mills Phipps died on October 19, 1970 in Roslyn, New York.

Philanthropy
Following her brother's death in 1937, Gladys Mills Phipps inherited their parents' mansion at Staatsburg, New York.

References

External links
 Halcyon Days: An American Family Through Three Generations by Peggie Phipps Boegner (daughter of John Shaffer Phipps), Richard Gachot (1987) Harry N. Abrams, Inc. 
 Bowen, Edward L.  Legacies of the Turf (Vol. 1) (2003) Eclipse Press 
 Mills Mansion at Staatsburg, New York 
 Phipps family racing at Chicago Barn to Wire
 Phipps family at Thoroughbred Times Company, Inc.

American racehorse owners and breeders
Philanthropists from New York (state)
People from Staatsburg, New York
1883 births
1970 deaths
Livingston family
Phipps family
People from Roslyn, New York